The Dragoman of the Sublime Porte, Dragoman of the Imperial Council (tercümân-ı dîvân-ı hümâyûn), or simply Grand or Chief Dragoman (tercümân başı), was the senior interpreter of the Ottoman government and de facto deputy foreign minister. From the position's inception in 1661 until the outbreak of the Greek Revolution in 1821, the office was occupied by Phanariotes, and was one of the main pillars of Phanariote power in the Ottoman Empire.

History
In the Ottoman Empire, the existence of official interpreters or dragomans (from the Italian rendering  of Arabic , Ottoman ) is attested from the early 16th century. As few Ottoman Turks ever learned European languages, from early times the majority of these men were of Christian origin—in the main Austrians, Hungarians, Poles, and Greeks.

In 1661, the Grand Vizier Ahmed Köprülü appointed the Greek Panagiotis Nikousios as Chief Dragoman to the Imperial Council. He was in turn succeeded in 1673 by another Greek, Alexander Mavrocordatos. These men began a tradition where almost all subsequent Grand Dragomans of the Porte were of Greek origin, or Hellenized Balkan Christians, and members of a small circle of Phanariote families, such as the Mavrocordatos, Ghica, Caradja or Callimachi clans. Many of the Phanariotes had previously served in the staffs of the European embassies in Constantinople. Nikousios, for instance, had previously (and for a time concurrently) served as translator for the Austrian embassy.

All dragomans had to be proficient in the 'three languages' of Arabic, Persian, and Turkish that were commonly used in the empire, as well as a number of foreign languages (usually French and Italian), but the responsibilities of Dragoman of the Porte went beyond that of a mere interpreter,  and were rather those of a minister in charge of the day-to-day conduct of foreign affairs. As such the post was the highest public office available to non-Muslims in the Ottoman Empire.

Nikousios and his successors managed to attach to their office a number of great privileges, such as tax exemption for themselves, their sons, and 20 members of their retinue; exemption from all customs fees for items destined for their personal use; immunity from all courts except from that of the Grand Vizier; permission to dress in the same kaftans as the Ottoman officials, and use ermine fur; or the permission to ride a horse. These made the position highly coveted, and the object of the Phanariotes' aspirations and rivalries. The salary of the Dragoman of the Porte amounted to 47,000  annually.

The success of the post led to the creation of a similar post, that of Dragoman of the Fleet, in 1701. The latter often served as a stepping-stone to the office of Grand Dragoman. There were also junior dragomans, for example for the Ottoman army, or for the Morea Eyalet, but these positions were never formalized in the same manner. From 1711, many former Grand Dragomans or Dragomans of the Fleet were appointed to the positions of princes (voivodes or hospodars) of the tributary Danubian Principalities of Wallachia and Moldavia. These four offices formed the foundation of Phanariote prominence in the Ottoman Empire.

The Phanariotes maintained this privileged position until the outbreak of the Greek Revolution in 1821: the then Dragoman of the Porte,  was beheaded, and his successor, was dismissed and exiled in 1822. The position of Grand Dragoman was then replaced by a guild-like Translation Bureau, staffed initially by converts like Ishak Efendi, but quickly exclusively by Muslim Turks fluent in foreign languages.

List of Dragomans of the Porte

References

Sources
 
 
 
 
 
 

 
Phanariotes
1661 establishments in the Ottoman Empire
1822 disestablishments in the Ottoman Empire
Dragoman of the Porte
Foreign relations of the Ottoman Empire